Itohan Ebireguesele (born 31 July 1990) is a Nigerian weightlifter. Competing in the 69 kg division she won medals at the 2010 and 2014 Commonwealth Games.

References

External links

1990 births
Living people
Nigerian female weightlifters
Commonwealth Games silver medallists for Nigeria
Commonwealth Games bronze medallists for Nigeria
Weightlifters at the 2010 Commonwealth Games
Weightlifters at the 2014 Commonwealth Games
Commonwealth Games medallists in weightlifting
20th-century Nigerian women
21st-century Nigerian women
Medallists at the 2010 Commonwealth Games
Medallists at the 2014 Commonwealth Games